Chalyboclydon marginata is a moth in the family Geometridae first described by William Warren in 1893. It is found in Myanmar, China and the Indian state of Sikkim.

References

Moths described in 1893
Larentiinae
Moths of Asia